Cliffords Mesne is an English village in Gloucestershire, two miles (3.2 km) south-west of the town of Newent. It became the home of the autobiographical author Winifred Foley from the mid-1970s, after the success of her first book of Gloucestershire reminiscences, A Child in the Forest.

Facilities
Cliffords Mesne possesses a public house, the Yew Tree Inn. The village is close to May Hill, which is owned by the National Trust, and to the International Centre for Birds of Prey. The Village Hall was refurbished in 2013 and holds regular social and musical events.

There is a single weekly bus service to and from Ross-on-Wye on Thursdays, but daily bus services between Gloucester and Ross-on-Wye pass through nearby Kilcot (4 km). The nearest railway station is Gloucester (20 km).

Heritage
The small Anglican church is dedicated to St Peter. Designed by E. S. Harris, it was built in 1882 of stone, with a central bellcote, a nave, a chancel, a south porch and a south vestry. It has contemporary stained glass dedicated to a local falconer and a memorial tablet to two local men who died on active service in the Second World War. The church parish is merged with Gorsley. It shares clergy with the benefice of Newent and lies in the Diocese of Gloucester.

An earlier stone church built in Gothic style in 1872 and extended in 1877, became the village school, which is now closed. The building serves as a non-denominational village hall.

The single listed historic building in Cliffords Mesne is the outlying Ravenshill Farmhouse, north of the village. Most of this dates from the late 17th and early 18th centuries. The combined population of Cliffords Mesne and Gorsley was 1320 in 1876.

References

External sources
Village website: Retrieved 22 August 2011.
A photograph of St Peter's Church: Retrieved 22 August 2011.
Photographs of features in or near Cliffords Mesne on Geograph site: Retrieved 22 August 2011. and here Retrieved 22 August 2011.

External links

Villages in Gloucestershire
Newent